A cheesymite scroll is a savoury Australian baked food commonly found at Bakers Delight and Brumby's bakeries, as well as at Australian supermarkets. It consists of a spiral of baked bread  similar to a pain aux raisins with Vegemite and cheese in place of raisins. Cheesymite scrolls are also home-baked. The cheesymite was first made in 1994.

References

Australian breads
Australian cuisine
Bread dishes
Cheese dishes
Pastries